The term formal operation may refer to:

 the formal operational period in Piaget's theory of cognitive development.
 a formal calculation in mathematical logic.